Eugenio A. Alvarez (July 21, 1918 – February 12, 1976) was an American lawyer and U.S. Representative from New York.

Life
He was born on July 21, 1918, in Bayamón, Puerto Rico. The family moved to New York City. There he attended Public School No. 19 and Curtis High School. He graduated from Wagner College and New York Law School. He married Ines Leon, and they had two children. They lived in the Bronx.

Alvarez entered politics as a Democrat. He was Deputy Director of Licensing of the New York City Taxi and Limousine Commission; a member of the New York State Assembly in 1973 and 1974; and Deputy New York City Commissioner of Housing Supervision from 1974 until his death in 1976.

He died on February 12, 1976, in Beekman Downtown Hospital in Manhattan.

See also
 Nuyorican
 Puerto Ricans in New York City

References

1918 births
1976 deaths
Politicians from the Bronx
People from Bayamón, Puerto Rico
Democratic Party members of the New York State Assembly
Curtis High School alumni
Wagner College alumni
New York Law School alumni
20th-century American politicians